John Wall is an American educator and theoretical ethicist who teaches at Rutgers University Camden.

Research 
Wall's research focuses on "the groundworks of moral life, particularly their relations to language, power, and childhood" and theoretical work where he argues that "ethical life is fundamentally creative," as well as for his concept of childism, or the empowerment of children by transforming norms".

Career 
Wall was born in 1965 in Leeds, United Kingdom and moved to the United States as a teenager. He obtained a BA, MA, and Ph.D. from the University of Chicago and taught for one year at DePaul University before taking up a permanent position at Rutgers University. 

At Rutgers University, Wall teaches in the departments of Philosophy, Religion, and Childhood Studies. He is the founding director of the Childism Institute and is the co-founder of the Children’s Voting Colloquium. In 2006 Wall assisted in the creation of a Childhood Studies doctoral program at Rutgers, which is the first of its type in the United States. He was also chair of the Childhood Studies and Religion Group at the American Academy of Religion.

Bibliography

Books 

 Paul Ricoeur and Contemporary Moral Thought (2002, co-editor, Routledge)
 Marriage, Health, and the Professions (2002, co-editor, Eerdmans)
Moral Creativity: Paul Ricoeur and the Poetics of Possibility (2005, Oxford University Press)
 Ethics in Light of Childhood (2010, Georgetown University Press)
 Children and Armed Conflict (2011, co-editor, Palgrave Macmillan)
 Children’s Rights: Today’s Global Challenge (2017, Rowman & Littlefield)
 Give Children the Vote: On Democratizing Democracy (2021, Bloomsbury Academic)

Journal articles

References 

Rutgers University faculty
Rutgers University–Camden
American ethicists
Year of birth missing (living people)
Living people